The 1979 Cal State Fullerton Titans baseball team represented California State University, Fullerton in the 1979 NCAA Division I baseball season. The Titans played their home games at Titan Field. The team was coached by Augie Garrido in his 7th season at Cal State Fullerton.

The Titans won the College World Series, defeating the Arkansas Razorbacks in the championship game.

Roster

Schedule 

! style="background:#FF7F00;color:#004A80;"| Regular Season
|- valign="top" 

|- align="center" bgcolor="#ddffdd"
| February 5 ||  || 13–6 || 1–0 || –
|- align="center" bgcolor="#ddffdd"
| February 8 || Arizona || 9–7 || 2–0 || –
|- align="center" bgcolor="#ffdddd"
| February 9 || at Arizona || 9–0 || 3–0 || –
|- align="center" bgcolor="#ddffdd"
| February 9 || at Arizona || 8–4 || 4–0 || –
|- align="center" bgcolor="#ffdddd"
| February 14 || at  || 2–4 || 4–1 || –
|- align="center" bgcolor="#ddffdd"
| February 16 ||  || 4–1 || 5–1 || –
|- align="center" bgcolor="#ddffdd"
| February 17 || California || 5–4 || 6–1 || –
|- align="center" bgcolor="#ddffdd"
| February 17 || California || 7–6 || 7–1 || –
|- align="center" bgcolor="#ddffdd"
| February 20 ||  || 5–3 || 8–1 || –
|- align="center" bgcolor="#ffdddd"
| February 23 || at  || 4–5 || 8–2 || –
|- align="center" bgcolor="#ddffdd"
| February 24 || at Arizona State || 3–10 || 8–3 || –
|- align="center" bgcolor="#ddffdd"
| February 24 || at Arizona State || 18–12 || 9–3 || –
|- align="center" bgcolor="#ddffdd"
| February 27 ||  || 9–2 || 10–3 || –
|- align="center" bgcolor="#ddffdd"
| February 28 ||  || 4–2 || 11–3 || –
|-

|- align="center" bgcolor="ddffdd"
| March 4 ||  || 3–1 || 12–3 || –
|- align="center" bgcolor="#ddffdd"
| March 6 || at Cal Poly Pomona || 13–6 || 13–3 || –
|- align="center" bgcolor="ffdddd"
| March 6 || at  || 6–9 || 13–4 || –
|- align="center" bgcolor="ddffdd"
| March 8 ||  || 4–2 || 14–4 || –
|- align="center" bgcolor="ddffdd"
| March 9 || UNLV || 12–0 || 15–4 || –
|- align="center" bgcolor="ddffdd"
| March 10 || at  || 13–6 || 16–4 || –
|- align="center" bgcolor="ddffdd"
| March 10 || at San Diego State || 10–3 || 17–4 || –
|- align="center" bgcolor="ddffdd"
| March 11 || at San Diego State || 10–4 || 18–4 || –
|- align="center" bgcolor="ddffdd"
| March 14 ||  || 15–0 || 19–4 || –
|- align="center" bgcolor="ddffdd"
| March 16 ||  || 10–6 || 20–4 || –
|- align="center" bgcolor="ffdddd"
| March 17 || New Mexico || 2–5 || 20–5 || –
|- align="center" bgcolor="ddffdd"
| March 17 || New Mexico || 4–1 || 21–5 || –
|- align="center" bgcolor="ddffdd"
| March 22 || at Chapman || 11–3 || 22–5 || –
|- align="center" bgcolor="ddffdd"
| March 23 ||  || 7–6 || 23–5 || –
|- align="center" bgcolor="ddffdd"
| March 24 ||  || 8–3 || 24–5 || –
|- align="center" bgcolor="ffdddd"
| March 24 || Stanford || 2–3 || 24–6 || –
|- align="center" bgcolor="ddffdd"
| March 30 ||  || 1–0 || 25–6 || 1–0
|- align="center" bgcolor="ddffdd"
| March 31 || at UC Irvine || 8–6 || 26–6 || 2–0
|- align="center" bgcolor="ddffdd"
| March 31 || at UC Irvine || 7–3 || 27–6 || 3–0
|-

|- align="center" bgcolor="ddffdd"
| April 3 ||  || 5–1 || 28–6 || 4–0
|- align="center" bgcolor="ffffdd"
| April 6 ||  || 11–11 || 28–6–1 || 4–0–1
|- align="center" bgcolor="ddffdd"
| April 7 || at San Diego || 10–3 || 29–6–1 || 5–0–1
|- align="center" bgcolor="ddffdd"
| April 7 || at San Diego || 8–2 || 30–6–1 || 6–0–1
|- align="center" bgcolor="ddffdd"
| April 8 || at  || 2–1 || 31–6–1 || 7–0–1
|- align="center" bgcolor="ddffdd"
| April 12 || vs. UC Irvine || 16–2 || 32–6–1 || –
|- align="center" bgcolor="ffdddd"
| April 13 || vs. Chapman || 4–13 || 32–7–1 || –
|- align="center" bgcolor="ddffdd"
| April 13 || vs. UC Irvine || 11–2 || 33–7–1 || –
|- align="center" bgcolor="ddffdd"
| April 14 || vs. Chapman || 5–2 || 34–7–1 || –
|- align="center" bgcolor="ffdddd"
| April 14 || vs. Chapman || 5–6 || 34–8–1 || –
|- align="center" bgcolor="ddffdd"
| April 17 ||  || 12–6 || 35–8–1 || 7–2–1
|- align="center" bgcolor="ffdddd"
| April 20 ||  || 3–5 || 35–9–1 || 7–1–1
|- align="center" bgcolor="ffdddd"
| April 21 || at Pepperdine || 9–10 || 35–10–1 || 8–2–1
|- align="center" bgcolor="ddffdd"
| April 21 || Pepperdine || 8–7 || 36–10–1 || 9–2–1
|- align="center" bgcolor="ffdddd"
| April 22 ||  || 12–4 || 37–10–1 || –
|- align="center" bgcolor="ddffdd"
| April 24 ||  || 7–2 || 38–10–1 || 10–2–1
|- align="center" bgcolor="ffdddd"
| April 27 || at  || 6–9 || 38–11–1 || 10–3–1
|- align="center" bgcolor="ddffdd"
| April 28 || Long Beach State || 7–1 || 39–11–1 || 11–3–1
|- align="center" bgcolor="ddffdd"
| April 28 || Long Beach State || 5–3 || 40–11–1 || 12–3–1
|-

|- align="center" bgcolor="ddffdd"
| May 1 || Pepperdine || 8–2 || 41–11–1 || 13–3–1
|- align="center" bgcolor="ddffdd"
| May 4 || at Cal State LA || 9–0 || 42–11–1 || 14–3–1
|- align="center" bgcolor="ddffdd"
| May 5 || Cal State LA || 8–3 || 43–11–1 || 15–3–1
|- align="center" bgcolor="ddffdd"
| May 5 || Cal State LA || 4–2 || 44–11–1 || 16–3–1
|- align="center" bgcolor="ddffdd"
| May 8 || UC Irvine || 10–6 || 45–11–1 || 17–3–1
|- align="center" bgcolor="ddffdd"
| May 11 || UC Santa Barbara || 21–2 || 46–11–1 || 18–3–1
|- align="center" bgcolor="ddffdd"
| May 12 || at UC Santa Barbara || 14–2 || 47–11–1 || 19–3–1
|- align="center" bgcolor="ddffdd"
| May 12 || at UC Santa Barbara || 18–0 || 48–11–1 || 20–3–1
|- align="center" bgcolor="ddffdd"
| May 15 || at Long Beach State || 10–5 || 49–11–1 || 21–3–1
|- align="center" bgcolor="ddffdd"
| May 18 || at Loyola Marymount || 17–6 || 50–11–1 || 22–3–1
|- align="center" bgcolor="ddffdd"
| May 19 || at Loyola Marymount || 7–4 || 51–11–1 || 23–3–1
|- align="center" bgcolor="ffdddd"
| May 19 || at Loyola Marymount || 3–5 || 51–12–1 || 23–4–1
|-

|-
! style="background:#FF7F00;color:#004A80;"| Post–Season
|-
|-

|- align="center" bgcolor="ffdddd"
| May 25 || vs. UCLA || Pete Beiden Field || 4–5 || Hudson (L; 9–4) || 384 || 51–13–1
|- align="center" bgcolor="ddffdd"
| May 26 || vs.  || Pete Beiden Field || 20–3 || Weatherman (W; 13–2) || – || 52–13–1
|- align="center" bgcolor="ddffdd"
| May 27 || vs.  || Pete Beiden Field || 12–3 || Sutton (W; 8–2) || 513 || 53–13–1
|- align="center" bgcolor="ddffdd"
| May 27 || vs. UCLA || Pete Beiden Field || 9–2 || Hudson (W; 10–4) || 420 || 54–13–1
|- align="center" bgcolor="ddffdd"
| May 28 || vs. UCLA || Pete Beiden Field || 9–5 || Navilhon (W; 14–0) || 392 || 55–13–1
|-

|- align="center" bgcolor="ffdddd"
| June 2 || vs.  || Rosenblatt Stadium || 1–6 || Navilhon (L; 14–1) || 11,047 || 55–14–1
|- align="center" bgcolor="ddffdd"
| June 3 || vs. Connecticut || Rosenblatt Stadium || 8–3 || Weatherman (W; 14–2) || 3,813 || 56–14–1
|- align="center" bgcolor="ddffdd"
| June 4 || vs. Arizona || Rosenblatt Stadium || 16–3 || Sutton (W; 9–2) || – || 57–14–1
|- align="center" bgcolor="ddffdd"
| June 6 || vs. Arkansas || Rosenblatt Stadium || 13–10 || Estrada (W; 3–0) || 9,091 || 58–14–1
|- align="center" bgcolor="ddffdd"
| June 7 || vs. Pepperdine || Rosenblatt Stadium || 8–5 || Sutton (W; 10–2) || 9,299 || 59–14–1
|- align="center" bgcolor="ddffdd"
| June 8 || vs. Arkansas || Rosenblatt Stadium || 2–1 || Weatherman (W; 15–2) || 10,158 || 60–14–1
|-

Awards and honors 
Dan Hanggie
 All-America Second Team
 College World Series All-Tournament Team
 All-SCBA First Team

Sam Favata
 All-SCBA First Team

Tony Hudson
 College World Series Most Outstanding Player
 College World Series All-Tournament Team

Kurt Kingsolver
 College World Series All-Tournament Team

Larry Navilhon
 All-SCBA First Team

Matt Vejar
 College World Series All-Tournament Team

Tim Wallach
 Golden Spikes Award
 The Sporting News Player of the Year
 All-America First Team
 College World Series All-Tournament Team
 SCBA Player of the Year
 All-SCBA First Team

Dave Weatherman
 All-SCBA First Team

Titans in the 1979 MLB Draft 
The following members of the Cal State Fullerton Titans baseball program were drafted in the 1979 Major League Baseball Draft.

References 

Cal State Fullerton
Cal State Fullerton Titans baseball seasons
College World Series seasons
NCAA Division I Baseball Championship seasons
Fullerton Titans